Electrophonic Chronic is the second studio album by the Arcs, a side project of Dan Auerbach of the Black Keys. It was released on January 27, 2023, under Auerbach's label Easy Eye Sound.

Recording
A second album was initially conceived by the Arcs following the release of their debut album Yours, Dreamily, (2015); however, this did not materialize. Electrophonic Chronic features the original lineup of the band and was recorded primarily prior to Richard Swift's death in 2018. Recording took place at Auerbach's Easy Eye Sound studios in Nashville, Electric Lady Studios in Manhattan, and Leon Michels' Diamond Mine Studio in Queens, New York. It was co-produced by Auerbach and Michels. The album was announced by the band on October 13, 2022, coinciding with the release of the lead single "Keep on Dreamin'".

Release and promotion
The album's first single "Keep on Dreamin'" was released simultaneously with the album announcement on October 13, 2022. A second single, "Heaven Is a Place", was released on November 10, 2022, along with a visualizer directed by Roboshobo that pays tribute to Swift. A third single, "Eyez", was released on December 8, 2022, along with a visualizer for it directed by Roboshobo. A fourth and final single, "Sunshine", was released on January 12, 2023. A music video for "Sunshine" directed by Roboshobo followed on January 23, 2023.

The band has no plans to tour in support of Electrophonic Chronic or to record new music. Commenting on band's period of creativity with Swift and David Berman, Leon Michels said, "It was almost like this insane manic creative energy that was unsustainable. That's why we recorded so much music. We were trying to basically capture this feeling that can’t sustain itself."

Critical reception

At Metacritic, which assigns a normalized rating out of 100 to reviews from professional publications, the album received an average score of 82, based on 7 reviews.

Bud Scoppa of Uncut gave the album an 8 out of 10 rating, writing, "Auerbach's stoic, close-mic'd vocals and gnarled tendrils of distorted guitar bring a devastating immediacy to an album that contemplates the death of love and, by extension, mortality itself, seeking closure." Christopher Connor of Clash wrote, "Worth the wait for fans. The record balances its psychedelia with more mediative moments offering plenty of variety. This record again shows Auerbach's musical influences and projects beyond The Black Keys." Stephen Thomas Erlewine of AllMusic wrote, "Electrophonic Chronic plays like an old-fashioned long-player instead of a stack of 45s, a heady experience that nevertheless is anchored in R&B. Maybe the thrills aren't as immediate as they are on Yours, Dreamily, yet the free-floating psychedelic soul is alluring, as well as a worthy tribute to Swift."

Track listing

Personnel 

The Arcs
 Dan Auerbach – lead vocals (1–3, 5–9, 11, 12), acoustic guitar (1, 7–9, 11), electric guitar (1–9, 11), bass (1, 3, 5, 11, 12), background vocals (2), fuzz bass (8), percussion (8)
 Leon Michels – Ace Tone (1, 2, 5, 6), Hammond B3 (1, 3, 5–9, 11, 12), synthesizer (1–3, 7, 11), horns (1, 6, 7), background vocals (2), Rhodes (3), piano (4, 6, 11), flute (9, 12), Mellotron (11), glockenspiel (12)
 Nick Movshon – bass (2, 4, 6–9)
 Homer Steinweiss – drums (2–4, 6–9, 11), percussion (4, 11)
 Richard Swift – drums (1, 5, 11, 12), background Vocals (1, 5–7, 9, 11), percussion (6, 11)

Additional musicians
 Shawn Camp – fiddle (4)
 Russ Pahl – steel guitar (4, 8)
 Sam Bacco – percussion (5–7), congas (6)
 Shae Fiol – background vocals (5, 6)
 Mireya Ramos – background vocals (5, 6)
 Hiroko Taguchi – violin (5, 12)
 Garo Yellin – cello (5, 12)
 Ray Mason – horns (6, 7)
 Thomas Brenneck – electric guitar (7)

Technical
 Dan Auerbach – production
 Leon Michels – production
 M. Allen Parker – engineering
 Ben Baptie – engineering
 Collin Dupuis – engineering
 Patrick Damphier – engineering
 Ken Takahashi – engineering
 Joe Visciano – engineering
 Phil Joly – engineering
 Caleb VanBuskirk – engineering
 McKinley James – additional engineering
 Tyler Zwiep – additional engineering
 Jonny Ullman – additional engineering
 Tchad Blake – mixing
 Greg Calbi – mastering
 Steve Fallone – mastering

Packaging
 Perry Shall – design, layout
 Omar "El Oms" Juarez – illustrations

Charts

References

2023 albums
The Arcs albums
Albums produced by Dan Auerbach
Albums recorded at Electric Lady Studios